A noxious weed, harmful weed or injurious weed is a weed that has been designated by an agricultural or other governing authority as a plant that is injurious to agricultural or horticultural crops, natural habitats or ecosystems, or humans or livestock. Most noxious weeds have been introduced into an ecosystem by ignorance, mismanagement, or accident. Some noxious weeds are native. Typically they are plants that grow aggressively, multiply quickly without natural controls (native herbivores, soil chemistry, etc.), and display adverse effects through contact or ingestion. Noxious weeds are a large problem in many parts of the world, greatly affecting areas of agriculture, forest management, nature reserves, parks and other open space.

Many noxious weeds have come to new regions and countries through contaminated shipments of feed and crop seeds or were intentionally introduced as ornamental plants for horticultural use.

Some "noxious weeds", such as ragwort, produce copious amounts of nectar, valuable for the survival of bees and other pollinators, or other advantages like larval host foods and habitats. In the USA, wild parsnip Pastinaca sativa, for instance, provides large tubular stems that some bee species hibernate in, larval food for two different swallowtail butterflies, and other beneficial qualities.

Types
Some noxious weeds are harmful or poisonous to humans, domesticated grazing animals, and wildlife. Open fields and grazing pastures with disturbed soils and open sunlight are often more susceptible. Protecting grazing animals from toxic weeds in their primary feeding areas is therefore important.

Control

Some guidelines to prevent the spread of noxious weeds are:
 Avoid driving through noxious weed-infested areas.
 Avoid transporting or planting seeds and plants that one cannot identify.
 For noxious weeds in flower or with seeds on plants, pulling 'gently' out and placing in a secure closable bag is recommended. Disposal such as hot composting or contained burning is done when safe and practical for the specific plant. Burning poison ivy can be fatal to humans.
 Using only certified weed-free seeds for crops or gardens.

Maintaining control of noxious weeds is important for the health of habitats, livestock, wildlife, and native plants, and of humans of all ages. How to control noxious weeds depends on the surrounding environment and habitats, the weed species, the availability of equipment, labor, supplies, and financial resources. Laws often require that noxious weed control funding from governmental agencies must be used for eradication, invasion prevention, or native habitat and plant community restoration project scopes.

Insects and fungi have long been used as biological controls of some noxious weeds and more recently nematodes have also been used.

Controversy and biases

Agricultural needs, desires, and concerns do not always mesh with those of other areas, such as pollinator nectar provision. Ragwort, for instance, was rated as the top flower meadow nectar source in a UK study, and in the top ten in another. Its early blooming period is also particularly helpful for the establishment of bumblebee colonies. Thistles that are considered noxious weeds in the USA and elsewhere, such as Cirsium arvense and Cirsium vulgare, have also rated at or near the top of the charts in multiple UK studies for nectar production, one of its native locations. These thistles also serve as a larval host plant for the painted lady butterfly. There can be, therefore, a conflict between agricultural policy and point of view and the point of view of conservationists or other groups.

By country

Australia

In Australia, the term "noxious weed" is used by state and territorial governments.

Canada
In Canada, constitutional responsibility for the regulation of agriculture and the environment is shared between the federal and provincial governments. The federal government through the Canadian Food Inspection Agency (CFIA) regulates invasive plants under the authority of the Plant Protection Act, the Seeds Act and statutory regulations. Certain plant species have been designated by the CFIA as noxious weeds in the Weed Seeds Order.

Each province also produces its own list of prohibited weeds. In Alberta, for example, a new Weed Control Act was proclaimed in 2010 with two weed designations: "prohibited noxious" (46 species) which are banned across Alberta, and "noxious" (29 species) which can be restricted at the discretion of local authorities.

New Zealand

New Zealand has had a series of Acts of Parliament relating to noxious weeds: the Noxious Weeds Act 1908, the Noxious Weeds Act 1950, and the Noxious Plants Act 1978. The last was repealed by the Biosecurity Act 1993, which used words such as "pest", "organism" and "species", rather than "noxious". Consequently, the term "noxious weed" is no longer used in official publications in New Zealand. According to this Act, control of the majority of problem weeds, now called 'pest plants', is the responsibility of Regional Councils, or unitary authorities, in a few councils.

United Kingdom 

The Weeds Act, 1959 covers Great Britain,   It is mainly relevant to farmers and other rural settings rather than the allotment or garden-scale growers. Five "injurious" weeds are listed. The word "injurious" means in this context harmful to agriculture,not liable to cause injury. All the species listed apart from ragwort are edible and appear in Richard Mabey's book Food for Free. They are all native plants. These are:
 Spear thistle (Cirsium vulgare)
 Creeping, or field, thistle (Cirsium arvense)
 Curled dock (Rumex crispus)
 Broad-leaved dock (Rumex obtusifolius)
 Common ragwort (Jacobaea vulgaris)

The Department for Environment, Food and Rural Affairs (DEFRA) provides guidance for the removal of these weeds from infested land. Much of this is oriented towards the use of herbicides.

The Act does not place any automatic legal responsibility on landowners to control the weeds,or make growing them illegal, but they may be ordered to control them. Most common farmland weeds are not "injurious" within the meaning of the Weeds Act and many such plant species have conservation and environmental value. The various UK government agencies responsible have a duty to try to achieve a reasonable balance among different interests. These include agriculture, countryside conservation and the general public.

Section 14 of the Wildlife and Countryside Act 1981 makes it an offence to plant or grow certain specified foreign invasive plants in the wild, listed in Schedule 9 of the Act, including giant hogweed and Japanese knotweed. Some local authorities have by-laws controlling these plants. There is no statutory requirement for landowners to remove these plants from their property.

Northern Ireland is covered by the Noxious Weeds (Northern Ireland) Order 1977.  This mirrors the Great Britain legislation, and covers the same five species, with the addition of:
 Wild oat (Avena fatua)
 Wild oat (Avena ludoviciana)

United States

The federal government defines noxious weeds under the Federal Noxious Weed Act of 1974. Noxious weeds are also defined by the state governments in the United States.

See also
 Caulerpa taxifolia
 Invasive species
 International Plant Protection Convention

References

External links
Australia
 Noxious Weeds List at Weeds Australia

New Zealand
 

United States
 Weeds at the Bureau of Land Management (US)
 Noxious Weed Program at the US Department of Agriculture
  —
 

Weeds
Agricultural pests
Garden pests
Habitat